Andrej Martin and Hans Podlipnik were the defending champions but only Podlipnik chose to defend his title, partnering Andrés Molteni. Podlipnik lost in the first round to Mauricio Echazú and Michael Linzer.

Sergio Galdós and Leonardo Mayer won the title after defeating Ariel Behar and Gonzalo Lama 6–2, 7–6(9–7) in the final.

Seeds

Draw

References
 Main Draw

Lima Challenger - Doubles